The front panel data port (FPDP) is a bus that provides high speed data transfer between two or more VMEbus boards at up to 160 Mbit/s with low latency.  The FPDP bus uses a 32-bit parallel synchronous bus wired with an 80-conductor ribbon cable.

The following interface functions are supported:
FPDP/TM (transmitter master) - drives data and timing signals onto the FPDP, and also terminates the bus signals at one end of the ribbon cable
FPDP/RM (receiver master) - receives data from the FPDP synchronously with the timing signals provided by the FPDP/TM, and also terminates the bus at the opposite end of the cable to the FPDP/TM
FPDP/R (receiver) - receives data from the FPDP synchronously with the timing signals provided by the FPDP/TM; it does not terminate the bus.  More than one FPDP/R can be connected to the FPDP bus.  It can also be an alternate function to that of FPDP/RM via software control.

The connector, denoted by the FPDP specification, is a KEL P/N 8825E-080-175.

Interface signals
 D<31:0> : Data bus driven by FPDP/TM
 DIR_n   : Active low Direction signal driven by FPDP/TM
 DVALID_n: Active low data valid indication driven by FPDP/TM
 STROBE  : A free running clock supplied by FPDP/TM
 NRDY_n  : Active low not ready signal driven by FPDP/R or FPDP/RM. Asserted before the commencement of transfer of data by the FPDP/R or FPDP/RM asynchronous to STROBE.
 PSTROBE : Optional Differential PECL version of the STROBE driven by FPDP/TM
 SUSPEND_n : Active low suspend signal asserted by FPDP/R or FPDP/RM asynchronous to STROBE to inform the transmitter that buffer flow condition may occur. The transmitter may delay not more than 16 clocks before it suspends the data transfer.
 SYNC_n  : Active low synchronization pulse provided by FPDP/TM.
 PIO1, PIO2 : Programmable I/O lines for user purposes

Data frames
The following types of data frames are supported:
 Unframed Data
 single frame Data
 Fixed size Repeating Frame Data
 Dynamic Size Repeating Frame Data

Cable length
FPDP interfaces work with up to a cable length of 1 meter when used in multi-drop configuration. They work up to 2 meter when using STROBE signal during point-to-point configuration. They work up to 5 meter when used with PSTROBE differential signal during point-to-point configuration.

See also
VMEbus - a computer bus standard widely used for many applications and standardized by the IEC as ANSI/IEEE 1014-1987
Serial FPDP - High-speed serial version of FPDP, that can be sent short distances over copper cables, or longer distances over optical fiber cable.

References

Computer buses
Digital electronics